The broyé poitevin or broyé du Poitou is a pastry from the historic Poitou province of France and made with an unleavened dough of sugar, flour, butter and eggs.

It is available in large or small sizes (8–100 cm in diameter and about 2 cm thick).

Confrérie de l'Ordre des Chevaliers de la Grand Goule 
Founded in 2004 in Poitiers, the Confrérie de l'Ordre des Chevaliers de la Grand Goule promotes the broyé poitevin. Its objective is to protect and enhance the tradition of the broyé poitevin. The Confrérie organises the annual Rencontres Gourmandes du Poitou.

See also
 
 List of pastries
 Shortbread

References

French pastries
French cakes